Lil' Libros is a Los Angeles-based independent bilingual children's book publisher. Its titles are distributed by Readerlink, Amazon, Baker & Taylor, Brodart, Follett Corporations, and other independent distributors across the United States. It is a member of the American Booksellers Association, Publishers Association of the West, and Independent Book Publisher's Association.

Lil' Libros was founded by Patty Rodriguez and Ariana Stein (née Sauceda) in 2014 with a focus on bilingual picture books and an emphasis on Latin American elements, including Loteria: First Words/Primeras Palabras and Counting Con/Contando con Frida, both of which led to being featured on online publications, Washington Post,  and Buzzfeed.  Rodriguez serves as CCO and Stein as CEO. As of 2017, Lil' Libros expanded its book line to include 10 titles in all so far and a board game. This rapid success led the company to promotion in other online publications such as Forbes, La Opinion, and L.A. Parent. The company signed a world wide distribution agreement in 2017 with Gibbs Smith and is expanding to create books for older age groups.

References

Book publishing companies based in California
Children's book publishers
Publishing companies based in California
Companies based in Los Angeles
American companies established in 2014
Publishing companies established in 2014
2014 establishments in California